Nathan Morcom (born 5 April 1992) is an Australian racing driver currently racing the No. 54 Holden VF Commodore for Eggleston Motorsport in the Dunlop Super2 Series.

Morcom won the 2016 Australian Endurance Championship and the 2016 Hi-Tec Oils Bathurst 6 Hour.

Career results

Career summary

TCR Australia results

Complete Bathurst 6 Hour results

References

Living people
1992 births
Australian racing drivers